Buurtzorg Nederland is a Dutch home-care organization which has attracted international attention for its innovative use of independent nurse teams in delivering  relatively low-cost care. The word buurtzorg is Dutch for “neighborhood care”.

History
It was founded in 2006 in the small city of Almelo by Jos de Blok and a small team of professional nurses who were dissatisfied with the delivery of health care by traditional home care organizations in the Netherlands. According to Sharda S. Nandram, the company has created a new management approach: “integrating simplification,” characterized by a simple, flat organizational structure through which a wide range of services, facilitated by information technology, can be provided.

Operation
When they go into a patient’s home, Buurtzorg’s nurses provide not only medical services but also support services, such as dressing and bathing, that are usually delegated to lesser-trained and cheaper personnel. Self-governing teams of 10 to 12 highly trained nurses take responsibility for the home care of 50 to 60 patients in a given neighbourhood. This permits flexibility in work arrangements to meet both nurses’ and patients’ needs. The organization has the most satisfied workforce of any Dutch company, with more than 1,000 employees. A study by KPMG published in January 2015 shows that the company is a low-cost provider of home-care services, and that this  is not attributable to its patient mix. When the patients’ nursing home, physician, and hospital costs were added to the analysis, total per-patient costs were about average for the Netherlands.

The organisation describes a package of six sequential components, which cannot be delivered separately:
 assess the client’s needs; the assessment is holistic and includes medical needs, Long Term Condition needs and personal/social needs. On the basis of the resulting information, the individual care plan will be drafted.
 map networks of informal care and involve them in care.
 to identify and include formal carers.
 care delivery.
 supporting the client in his/her social roles.
 promote self-care and independence.

International
The company employed 10,000 nurses and 4,500 home help workers in 2018, with teams in the Netherlands, Sweden, and Japan. It now provides home care to about 80,000 people; more than half of all district nurses in the Netherlands work for the organization.  In the USA the organization faces the need to deal with multiple payers, each with its own payment rules and procedures which makes it difficult for nurses to do their own billing as they do in Holland.

The company is concerned about a cutback in the Dutch home nursing budget of 400 million euros, 10% less than last year's community care budget. The company is getting more applications from people who are entitled to home care. It expects a growth of 15,000 clients.

A Welsh Buurtzorg pilot is to be established by NHS Wales from 2018-20 with £2 million funding.  The Royal College of Nursing said, “The RCN has long supported this model, which was founded in the Netherlands and has garnered international acclaim for its nurse-led, cost-effective principles, which rely upon nurse-innovation leading the way for care of patients in their own communities.”

In France, the not for profit organisation Soignons Humain (www.soignonshumain.com) has started operating in 2016, as official licensed partner of Buurtzorg.

References

External links
 Company website (USA version)

Nursing organizations
Medical and health organisations based in the Netherlands